Ashot Anastasian (10 July 1964 – 26 December 2016) was an Armenian chess Grandmaster. He won two team bronze medals and one individual gold medal at Chess Olympiads. On the March 2011 FIDE list, he had an Elo rating of 2556, making him ranked number 14 in Armenia.

Anastasian won the Armenian Chess Championship in 1983, 1985, 1986, 1987, 1988, 1992, 1994, and 2005. He received his International Master title in 1988 and Grandmaster title in 1993. In 1993 he placed first in Katowice. In 2007, he tied for first with Bassem Amin in the Abu Dhabi Chess Festival.

In September 2009 FIDE rating list he was ranked 325th in the world among active players.

In 2010, he was appointed coach of the Armenian national women's team.

On 26 December 2016, Armenpress reported that Anastasian had died.

Notable games
Ashot Anastasian vs. Sergei Tiviakov (1999) at the European Team Championship Games, 1-0

Notes

External links
Grandmaster Games Database - Ashot Anastasian

1964 births
2016 deaths
Sportspeople from Yerevan
Armenian chess players
Chess grandmasters
Chess Olympiad competitors
Chess coaches
National team coaches